A list of films produced in France in 1926:

See also
1926 in France

References

External links
French films of 1926 on IMDb
French films of 1926 at Cinema-francais.fr

1926
Lists of 1926 films by country or language
Films